Owranj (also Romanized as Owranj and Ūranj) is a village in Gerdeh Rural District, in the Central District of Namin County, Ardabil Province, Iran. At the 2006 census, its population was 352, in 84 families.

References 

Towns and villages in Namin County